Masone is a municipality in Genoa in Italy.

Masone may also refer to:

Masone (surname)
Masone, a hamlet of Reggio Emilia, Italy